Crane High School may refer to one of the schools in the United States:

 Crane High School (Chicago)
 Crane High School (Illinois)
 Crane High School (Missouri)
 Crane High School (Texas)
 Crane Union High School, in Crane, Oregon